Jaroslav Foglar (6 July 1907 – 23 January 1999) was a Czechoslovak writer who wrote many novels about youths (partly also about Boy Scouts movement) and their adventures in nature and dark city streets. His signature series is Rychlé šípy, which was adapted into comics by Jan Fischer.

Early life

Foglar was born in 1907 and grew up in Prague. Because his father died prematurely he was brought up in rather poor material conditions by his mother. To earn some extra money young Slavik used to copy the popular detective stories, cliftonky,  earning 20 heller per copy. (This initially affected his literary style, and some of the first editions of his books were to be corrected later, to get rid of the literary slag.)

He was strongly influenced by romantic parts of Prague. All of the fictional towns in his novels are more or less derived from Prague. During the 1920s, Foglar was strongly influenced by German independent Wandervogel movement as well as Scout movement led by Antonín Benjamin Svojsík under Czech name Junák.

Writer and editor career, prohibited writer and the end of life
During the 1930s and 1940s, Foglar worked as a magazine editor in one of the largest Prague publishing houses, Melantrich. He edited several journals for youths:
 Mladý hlasatel ("Young herald"), 1938–1941
 Junák ("Scout"), 1945–1949
 Vpřed ("Ahead"), 1946–1948
and he wrote articles for other journals including the Skaut, Sluníčko, ABC, and the Tramp.

After the Communist coup in 1948 Foglar was kicked out of the publishing house, his magazines were liquidated and his books prohibited, as was the Scout movement and independent youth clubs. For many years he worked as a tutor in boarding schools and youth homes. During the fall of censorship at the end of the 1960s, he published some new books and re-editions of the older ones. After Soviet occupation of Czechoslovakia his books were once again banned until 1989.

Foglar lived with his mother caring for her until her death in high age and never married.

Scout versus Youth Club movement
Although Foglar worked as a Boy Scout leader, his relation to the Scout movement was not straightforward. He basically pictured the Boy Scouts only in few of his novels (especially Pod junackou vlajkou a Devadesatka pokracuje), preferring to write mostly about his own invention, the boy clubs.
Foglar's idea of independent boy clubs is basically derived from German Wandervogel movement. As editor of Mladý Hlasatel, Foglar systematically build clubbist ideology (based on friendship, good deeds, personal sacrifice, love of the nature, etc.) on some and traditions and own terminology. Clubs were small groups between 4 and 8 youths. Some of them were informally led by young men few years older than other youths, like Rikitan in novel Hoši od Bobří řeky or by best of the youths - like 'exemplary youth' Mirek Dušín of Rychlé šípy Club. With Foglar's novels and magazine articles as examples, many Czech youths established such clubs. In the golden age of club movement, there were thousands of such independent clubs, which presented a type of Wandervogel-like alternative to the organized Scout movement.
On the other hand, when Scouts were persecuted and forbidden during the German occupation between 1938 and 1945 and during Communism between 1948 and 1989 (with short exception of renewal of Scout during 1968 and 1969), boy clubs posed excellent informal alternative of youth life based on ideas similar to those of Scouts.

Ideal friendship and Ideal of male education
One of the key motives of Foglar's novels is the tension between the loneliness and close friendship between young male heroes. These are especially distinctive in novels 'Přístav volá', 'Když duben přichází', 'Chata v Jezerní kotlině', 'Modrá rokle' and 'Tajemná Řásnovka'. These novels are also non-scout ones, picturing independent life of youths. On the other hand, in second large group of his novels, a 'group hero' novels, the plot is based on stories of some organized group of youths, with less individual psychology and more action and adventures. The heroes are boy scouts or independent clubbists.

Homoerotic elements in his novels

Some critics argued that Foglar's novels are crammed with covert homoerotic desire, or that the author himself was gay. Foglar was strongly influenced by German Wandervogel romanticism more than the ideas of British scout movement (which emerged in Czech Lands during the WWI). Wandervogel movement itself had some elements of male eroticism. Most of Foglar's novels include close friendships between two youths, with some exceptions in relation to the 'group-hero' novels like 'Rychlé šípy' Club and 'Devadesátka'. 

Foglar's novels are set in a prevalently male world, where women are often irrelevant (old grannies or small girls, often without names). This homosociality was very common in literature of the period, regardless of the sexual orientation of the author. Besides, there are also a few strong female characters in his books, and especially in his comic series "Rychlé šípy". Foglar did have a few serious (though eventually unsuccessful) love affairs with girls.

Books
Note: the list is probably incomplete.
 Rychlé šípy
 Hoši od Bobří řeky ("Boys from the Beavers' river")
 Přístav volá ("The port is calling")
 Když duben přichází ("When April is coming")
 Pod junáckou vlajkou ("Under the Scouts' flag")
 Devadesátka pokračuje ("The Ninety goes on")
 Záhada hlavolamu ("Mystery of the conundrum"), the mechanical puzzle Hedgehog in the Cage plays a central role in the book
 Stínadla se bouří ("The Shades are revolting")
 Tajemství velkého Vonta ("Secret of the High Vont")
 Strach nad Bobří řekou ("Fear above the Beavers' river")
 Chata v jezerní kotlině ("The log-house in the lake basin")
 Tábor smůly ("The camp of ill luck")
 Tajemná Řásnovka ("Mysterious Řásnovka")
 Boj o první místo ("A fight over the first place")
 Historie svorné sedmy ("History of the harmonious seven")
 Poklad Černého delfína ("Treasure of the Black dolphin")
 Kronika ztracené stopy ("Chronicle of the lost track")
 Náš oddíl ("Our troop")
 Dobrodružství v zemi nikoho ("An adventure in the no-man's land")
 Modrá rokle ("The Blue gorge")
 Jestřábe, vypravuj ("Tell us the story, Goshawk")
 Život v poklusu ("A life in a trot")

See also
 Junák

Sources

External links
  Foglar info
  Foglar e-zin
  Society of Friends of Jaroslav Foglar

1907 births
1999 deaths
Czechoslovak male writers
Czechoslovak comics writers
Scouting in popular culture
Writers from Prague
People associated with Scouting
Scouting and Guiding in the Czech Republic
Recipients of Medal of Merit (Czech Republic)